Rajnandgaon is one of the 90 Legislative Assembly constituencies of Chhattisgarh state in India. It is in Rajnandgaon district and is a segment of Rajnandgaon Lok Sabha constituency.

Member of Legislative Assembly

Madhya Pradesh Legislative Assembly 
 1967: Kishorilal Shukla, Indian National Congress 
 1972: Kishorilal Shukla, Indian National Congress 
 1977: Thakur Darbar Singh, Janata Party
 1980: Kishorilal Shukla, Independent
 1985: Balbir Khanuja, Indian National Congress
 1990: Lilaram Bhojwani, Bharatiya Janata Party
 1993: Uday Mudliyar, Indian National Congress
 1998: Leelaram Bhojwani, Bharatiya Janata Party

Chhattisgarh Legislative Assembly 
 2003: Uday Mudliyar, Indian National Congress
 2008: Dr. Raman Singh, Bharatiya Janata Party 
 2013: Dr. Raman Singh, Bharatiya Janata Party

Election Results

2008 Vidhan Sabha
 Dr. Raman Singh (BJP) : 77,230 votes 
 Udai Mudliyar (INC) : 44,841

2018 Vidhan Sabha

See also
 Rajnandgaon district
 List of constituencies of Chhattisgarh Legislative Assembly

References

Assembly constituencies of Chhattisgarh
Rajnandgaon district
Rajnandgaon